Wick River, known also as River Wick, is a river in Caithness in Highland, Scotland.  It has its source at the confluence of Scouthal Burn and Strath Burn near Achingale Mill at the northern end of Bardarclay Moss in the Flow Country.  The river estuary, is in the North Sea bay of Wick and is straddled by the town of Wick. The source is at a height of about 25 metres, about 11 kilometres west and 2 kilometres north of the estuary.

The river basin includes Loch Watten and Loch Tofingall to the west of the estuary, and Loch Hempriggs and the Loch of Yarrows to the south/southwest.

Tributaries
Viewed upstream from the estuary, the river and its tributaries can be listed as follows:
 Wick River
 Burn of Newton
 Loch Hempriggs
 Burn of Thrumster
 Loch of Yarrows
 Burn of Gillock
 Achairn Burn
Alt Beag-airighe
Camster Loch
 Toftgunn headwaters
 Loch Burn, Watten
 Loch Watten
 Scouthal Burn
 Burn of Acharole
 Loch Burn (Toftingall)
 Loch of Toftingall
 Strath Burn
 Kensary Burn
 Camster Burn, known also as Rowens Burn

Estuary
The Wick River estuary ranges from the vicinity of Wick Harbour to an area about 2.5 kilometres inland.

On both sides of the estuary, areas of Wick are built on artificial embankment which have narrowed the river channel, or have fixed a channel where otherwise the area would be more that of tidal beach.

Bridges
The river is spanned by one railway, three roads and two footbridges. In order from the sea, they are:
 Within Wick, the Harbour Bridge spans the river at its mouth, to link Wick town centre with Wick Harbour and Pulteneytown. It stands instead of the earlier Service Bridge.
 Also in Wick, the river is spanned by the main road linking John o' Groats with Latheron and Inverness (the A99-A9). The bridge here is known as the Bridge of Wick and it carries an extension of Wick’s Bridge Street.
 Around 500 metres west of the Bridge of Wick, a footbridge spans the river via an island in the river, and this serves as a link between recreational meadows on the north and south banks.
 About halfway between the footbridge and the railway bridge there is another footbridge.
 Around 300 metres east of Mary Ford, the river is crossed by the railway which links the burgh of Wick with the burgh of Thurso and the city of Inverness.
 In Watten, the river is crossed by the main highway, A882, linking Wick with Thurso, known as Achingale Bridge.

External links 

Rivers of Highland (council area)